On the Spot may refer to:

 On the Spot (2003 TV series), an American sketch comedy television series which aired during 2003 on the WB Television Network
 On the Spot (2011 TV series), an American reality/trivia television series that debuted in syndication in 2011
 On the Spot (Australian TV program), an Australian religious panel discussion television program that aired on Melbourne TV station GTV-9 from 1959 to 1960
 On the Spot (Canadian TV series), a Canadian television series produced by the National Film Board of Canada from 1953 to 1954
 On the Spot (Hungarian TV series), a Hungarian documentary television series
 On the Spot (UK game show), a game show in the United Kingdom, which is also in conjunction with the National Lottery
 On the Spot (U.S. game show), a locally produced game show which aired from 1984 to 1988 on KGW-TV in Portland, OR
 On the Spot (webcast), a weekly webcast hosted by GameSpot
 On the Spot (Rooster Teeth), a weekly online game show
 "On the Spot", a retired pricing game from The Price Is Right
 On the Spot, a New Zealand convenience store chain run by Foodstuffs
 On the Spot!, 1967 album by Jaki Byard
 On the Spot (play), a 1930 play by Edgar Wallace
 On the Spot (film), a 1940 American comedy film